The San Pedro Beach Bums is a 1977 American sitcom that aired on ABC. It is about five carefree, young men living together on a houseboat in San Pedro, California. The pilot, titled The San Pedro Bums, originally aired on May 13, 1977. The main series aired from September 19 to December 19, 1977.

Cast
 Christopher Murney as Buddy Binder
 Stuart Pankin as Anthony "Stuf" Danelli
 John Mark Robinson as Ed "Dancer" McClory
 Darryl McCullough as Moose Maslosky
 Jeff Druce as Boychick (pilot only)
 Chris DeRose as Boychick (weekly series)
 Louise Hoven as Louise
 Susan Mullen as Suzi Camelli
 Lisa Reeves as Margie
 Kristoff St. John as Ralphie
 Nancy Morgan as Julie

Synopsis
Five carefree, young men in their early 20s who all had been friends since high school discover a derelict boat in the harbor at San Pedro, California. They take possession of it, name it Our Boat, and move aboard to use it as their houseboat. Buddy is smart, tough, streetwise, always confident, and the group's self-proclaimed leader; the shy, nervous, and not very bright Dancer is so nicknamed because he is too fidgety to sit still; Stuf is intellectual and sophisticated and a compulsive eater and gourmand who sees beauty in being overweight; Moose is large, muscled, and stupid, but gentle; and Boychick is a Clark Gable-like ladies man. Headquartered aboard Our Boat, they experience many slapstick, almost cartoonish adventures.

Suzi Camelli, Julie, and Ralphie are friends of the Bums, Margie is a lifeguard, and Louise is the waitress at Tina Teena's Beach Café.

Production
On May 13, 1977, ABC broadcast the pilot for The San Pedro Beach Bums,  a 90-minute movie titled The San Pedro Bums, which told the story of the "Bums" finding Our Boat and moving onto it. Although a similar premise had not worked in the unsuccessful comedy-drama It's a Man's World in 1962–1963, ABC believed in the concept, and it picked up the show as a weekly one-hour sitcom for its Fall 1977 schedule. Concerned that the use of the word "bums" in the pilots title could be construed as negative and drive some viewers away unless softened by a more lighthearted connotation, ABC changed the name of the weekly series to The San Pedro Beach Bums. A cast change also took place, with Jeff Druce, who played Boychick in the pilot, replaced by Christopher DeRose in the weekly series.

To boost viewership for The San Pedro Beach Bums, ABC scheduled it as the lead-in for the 1977 season of the popular ABC Monday Night Football. To garner extra attention for the shows premiere in September 1977, the women who starred as the "Angels" in the hit ABC program Charlie's Angels – Kate Jackson, Jaclyn Smith, and Cheryl Ladd – guest-starred as themselves in the episode.

Aaron Spelling and Douglas S. Cramer were the shows executive producers. E. Duke Vincent wrote and [produced the pilot, and Barry Shear directed it. Episode directors were Jack Arnold, Allen Baron, Earl Bellamy, Gene Nelson, George Tyne, and Don Weis. Episode writers included Earl Barret, William Raynor, and Myles Wilder.

Broadcast history
The San Pedro Beach Bums aired at 8:00 p.m. on Mondays throughout its run. ABC broadcast new episodes weekly from September 19 to October 31, 1977, followed by one more in November 1977 and two December 1977. Despite heavy promotion, highly favorable scheduling, and cross-marketing with more successful ABC shows, The San Pedro Beach Bums never gained much of an audience, and ABC cancelled the show after the broadcast of its 10th episode on December 19, 1977. An 11th episode was made, but did not air.

Episodes
Sources

Pilot (1977)

Season 1 (1977)

References

External links
ABC promo for the September 19, 1977, premiere episode of The San Pedro Beach Bums on YouTube
televisiontunes.com The San Pedro Beach Bums Theme Song (audio)

American Broadcasting Company original programming
1977 American television series debuts
1977 American television series endings
1970s American sitcoms
English-language television shows
Television shows set in Los Angeles
Television series by Spelling Television
Television series by CBS Studios